Khaz may refer to:
 Khaz-e Bahari, village in Khash County, Sistan and Baluchestan Province, Iran
 Khaz Pari, village in Mirjaveh County, Sistan and Baluchestan Province, Iran
 Khaz-e Bala, village in Khuzestan Province, Iran
 Khaz Oruzgan, village in Afghanistan where the 2008 Battle of Khaz Oruzgan took place
 Khaz'al al-Ka'bi (1863–1936), Emir of the Sheikhdom of Mohammerah, now part of the Khuzestan Province, Iran
 Khaz-Bulat Askar-Sarydzha  (1900–1982), Soviet Dagestani sculptor
 Khaz (musician), stage name of trance musician Carey Stansfield active circa 2010
 Khaz (notation), plural: "khazes", traditional Armenian neumes, a set of special signs constituting a system of musical notation known in Armenia at least since the 8th century

KhAZ may refer to:
 KhAZ, short for Khakas Aluminium Smelter, major aluminium smelter located near Sayanogorsk, Russia
 KhAZ, short for Kharkov Aviation Factory, historical name of the Kharkov State Aircraft Manufacturing Company, aircraft manufacturer in Kharkov, Ukraine
 KhAZ-30 (formerly known as KhAZ ViS-3 and KhAZ ViS-5), high wing, single-engine ultralight aircraft produced in Kharkov since 2012

KHAZ may refer to:
 KHAZ, call sign for the 99.5 FM frequency radio station in the U.S. state of Kansas

See also:
 Khazz, the head of the Muslims living in the Khazar Khanate
 Haz, Yemen
 HAZ (disambiguation)